Strontium fluoride, SrF2, also called strontium difluoride and strontium(II) fluoride, is a fluoride of strontium. It is a brittle white crystalline solid. In nature, it appears as the very rare mineral strontiofluorite.

Preparation
Strontium fluoride is prepared by the action of hydrofluoric acid on strontium carbonate.

Structure
The solid adopts the fluorite structure. In the vapour phase the SrF2 molecule is non-linear with an F−Sr−F angle  of approximately  120°. This is an exception to VSEPR theory which would predict a linear structure. Ab initio calculations have been cited to propose that contributions from d orbitals in the shell below the valence shell are responsible. Another proposal is that polarization of the electron core of the strontium atom creates an approximately tetrahedral distribution of charge that interacts with  the Sr−F bonds.

Properties
It is almost insoluble in water (its Ksp value is approximately 2.0x10−10 at 25 degrees Celsius).

It irritates eyes and skin, and is harmful when inhaled or ingested.
Similar to CaF2 and BaF2, SrF2 displays superionic conductivity at elevated temperatures.

Strontium fluoride is transparent to light in the wavelengths from vacuum ultraviolet (150 nm) to infrared (11 µm). Its optical properties are intermediate to calcium fluoride and barium fluoride.

Uses
Strontium fluoride is used as an optical material for a small range of special applications, for example, as an optical coating on lenses and also as a thermoluminescent dosimeter crystal.

Another use is as a carrier of strontium-90 radioisotope in radioisotope thermoelectric generators.

References

Fluorides
Strontium compounds
Optical materials
Crystals
Alkaline earth metal halides
Fluorite crystal structure